Nizhnetagirovo (Tübänge Tahir) is a rural locality (a village) in Temyasovsky Selsoviet, Baymaksky District, Bashkortostan, Russia. The population was 498 as of 2010. There are 5 streets.

Geography 
Nizhnetagirovo is located 62 km north of Baymak (the district's administrative centre) by road. Bilyalovo is the nearest rural locality.

References 

Rural localities in Baymaksky District